Polymorphomyia basilica is a species of tephritid or fruit flies in the genus Polymorphomyia of the family Tephritidae.

Distribution
Cuba, Dominican Republic, Jamaica, Puerto Rico.

References

Tephritinae
Insects described in 1894
Diptera of North America